Banchha Elo Phire (বাঞ্ছা এলো ফিরে   |   Banchha Elo Phire). This is a Bengali comedy film. It released on 21 October 2016.

Plot
The film follows Bancharam, an old man who is at risk of losing his land to developers who want to build a national highway. His grandson, Guneswar, is all for selling the land, despite his grandfather's wishes. Unfortunately for Bancharam, he dies and his spirit visits Zamindar Narahari Dutta in order to ask for help.

Cast

Songs

References

External links 
 IMDB LINK

Bengali-language Indian films
2010s Bengali-language films
2016 films